The 37th Golden Bell Awards (Mandarin:第37屆金鐘獎) was held on October 4, 2002 at the Sun Yat-sen Memorial Hall, Taipei, Taiwan. The ceremony was broadcast live by TTV.

Winners and nominees
Below is the list of winners and nominees for the main categories.

References

2002
2002 television awards
2002 in Taiwan